The Curtiss SB2C Helldiver is a dive bomber developed by Curtiss-Wright during World War II. As a carrier-based bomber with the United States Navy (USN), in Pacific theaters, it supplemented and replaced the Douglas SBD Dauntless. A few survivors are extant.

Initially poor handling characteristics and late modifications caused lengthy delays to production and deployment, to the extent that it was investigated by the Truman Committee, which turned in a scathing report. This contributed to the decline of Curtiss as a company. Neither pilots nor aircraft carrier skippers seemed to like it. Nevertheless, the type was faster than the Dauntless, and by the end of the Pacific War, the Helldiver had become the main dive bomber and attack aircraft on USN carriers.

By the time a land-based variant, known as the A-25 Shrike, became available in late 1943, the Western Allied air forces had abandoned dedicated dive-bombers. A majority of A-25s delivered to the US Army Air Forces were transferred to the US Marine Corps, which used the type only in one side campaign and non-combat roles. The British Royal Navy and the Royal Australian Air Force also cancelled substantial orders, retaining only a few aircraft for research purposes.

Nicknames for the aircraft included "Big-Tailed Beast" or just "Beast", "Two-Cee", and "Son-of-a-Bitch 2nd Class"; the latter nickname was derived from the name SB2C and the aircraft's reputation for having difficult handling characteristics.

Design and development

The Helldiver was developed to replace the Douglas SBD Dauntless. It was a much larger aircraft, able to operate from the latest aircraft carriers and carry a considerable array of armament. It featured an internal bomb bay that reduced drag when carrying heavy ordnance. Saddled with demanding requirements set forth by both the U.S. Marines and United States Army Air Forces, the manufacturer incorporated features of a "multi-role" aircraft into the design.

The Model XSB2C-1 prototype initially suffered teething problems connected to its Wright R-2600 Twin Cyclone engine and three-bladed propeller; further concerns included structural weaknesses, poor handling, directional instability, and bad stall characteristics. In 1939, a student took a model of the new Curtiss XSB2C-1 to the MIT wind tunnel. Professor of Aeronautical Engineering Otto C. Koppen was quoted as saying, "if they build more than one of these, they are crazy". He was referring to controllability issues with the small vertical tail.

The first prototype made its maiden flight on 18 December 1940. It crashed on 8 February 1941 when its engine failed on approach, but Curtiss was asked to rebuild it. The fuselage was lengthened and a larger tail was fitted, while an autopilot was fitted to help the poor stability. The revised prototype flew again on 20 October 1941, but was destroyed when its wing failed during diving tests on 21 December 1941.

Large-scale production had already been ordered on 29 November 1940, but a large number of modifications were specified for the production model. Fin and rudder area were increased, fuel capacity was increased, self-sealing fuel tanks were added, and the fixed armament was doubled to four 0.50 in (12.7 mm) machine guns in the wings, compared with the prototype's two cowling guns. The SB2C-1 was built with larger fuel tanks, improving its range considerably.

The program suffered so many delays that the Grumman TBF Avenger entered service before the Helldiver, even though the Avenger had begun its development two years later. Nevertheless, production tempo accelerated with production at Columbus, Ohio and two Canadian factories: Fairchild Aircraft Ltd. (Canada), which produced 300 (under the designations XSBF-l, SBF-l, SBF-3, and SBF-4E), and Canadian Car and Foundry, which built 894 (designated SBW-l, SBW-3, SBW-4, SBW-4E, and SBW-5), these models being respectively equivalent to their Curtiss-built counterparts. A total of 7,140 SB2Cs were produced in World War II.

Operational history

US Navy

The first version of the SB2C-1 was kept stateside for training, its various development problems leading to only 200 being built. The first deployment model was the SB2C-1C. The SB2C-1 could deploy slats mechanically linked with landing gear actuators, that extended from the outer third of the wing leading edge to aid lateral control at low speeds. The early prognosis of the "Beast" was unfavourable; it was strongly disliked by aircrews due to its size, weight, and reduced range compared to the SBD it replaced.

In the Battle of the Philippine Sea, 45 Helldivers, most of which had been launched from extreme range, were lost when they ran out of fuel while returning to their carriers.

Among its major faults, the Helldiver was underpowered, had a shorter range than the SBD, was equipped with an unreliable electrical system, and was often poorly manufactured. The Curtiss-Electric propeller and the complex hydraulic system had frequent maintenance problems. One of the faults remaining with the aircraft through its operational life was poor longitudinal stability, resulting from a fuselage that was too short due to the necessity of fitting onto aircraft carrier elevators. The Helldiver's aileron response was also poor and handling suffered greatly under  airspeed; since the speed of approach to land on a carrier was supposed to be , this proved problematic. The 880 changes demanded by the Navy and modification of the aircraft to its combat role resulted in a 42% weight increase, explaining much of the problem.

This substantially solved the chronic lack of power that had plagued the aircraft. The Helldivers would participate in battles over the Marianas, Philippines (partly responsible for sinking the battleship ), Taiwan, Iwo Jima, and Okinawa (in the sinking of the battleship ). They were also used in the 1945 attacks on the Ryukyu Islands and the Japanese home island of Honshū in tactical attacks on airfields, communications and shipping. They were also used extensively in patrols during the period between the dropping of the atomic bombs and the official Japanese surrender, and in the immediate pre-occupation period.

An oddity of the SB2Cs with 1942 to 1943-style tricolor camouflage was that the undersides of the outer wing panels carried dark topside camouflage because the undersurfaces were visible from above when the wings were folded.

In operational experience, it was found that the U.S. Navy's Grumman F6F Hellcat and Vought F4U Corsair fighters were able to carry an equally heavy bomb load against ground targets and were vastly more capable of defending themselves against enemy fighters. The Helldiver, however, could still deliver ordnance with more precision against specific targets and its two-seat configuration permitted a second set of eyes. A Helldiver also has a significant advantage in range over a fighter while carrying a bombload, which is extremely important in naval operations.

The advent of air-to-ground rockets ensured that the SB2C was the last purpose-built dive bomber produced. Rockets allowed precision attack against surface naval and land targets, while avoiding the stresses of near-vertical dives and the demanding performance requirements that they placed on dive bombers.

 
The SB2C remained in active postwar service in active duty US Navy squadrons until 1947 and in Naval Reserve aviation units until 1950. Surplus aircraft were sold to the naval air forces of France, Italy, Greece, Portugal, and Thailand. Greek SB2Cs served in combat in the Greek Civil War with additional machine guns mounted in wing pods. French SB2Cs flew in the First Indochina War from 1951 to 1954.

US Army and US Marine Corps service
Built at Curtiss' St. Louis plant, 900 aircraft were ordered by the USAAF under the designation A-25A Shrike. The first ten aircraft had folding wings, while the remainder of the production order omitted this feature. Many other changes distinguished the A-25A, including larger main wheels, a pneumatic tailwheel, ring and bead gunsight, longer exhaust stubs, and other Army-specified radio equipment. By late 1943, when the A-25A was being introduced, the USAAF no longer had a role for the dive bomber, as fighter aircraft such as the Republic P-47 Thunderbolt had shown their ability to carry out tactical air support missions with great success.

The USAAF transferred 410 Helldivers to the US Marines. The A-standard 25As were converted to the USMC variant, SB2C-1 and one squadron, VMSB-151, based on Enjebi (a.k.a. Engebi/Enjibe; part of Enewetak Atoll) conducted bombing missions on bypassed Japanese strongpoints nearby. Otherwise, the SB2C-1 variant never saw combat, and was used primarily as a trainer and target tug.

Australian service

At an early stage of World War II, the Australian government noted that the Royal Australian Air Force (RAAF) lacked dedicated dive bombers and ordered 150 Curtiss Shrikes. These aircraft were paid for by the US Government as Lend Lease aid.

By November 1943, when the first shipment of 10 Shrikes arrived in Australia, the RAAF had decided that dive bombing was an outmoded tactic. Vultee Vengeance dive bombers, which were already in service with the RAAF, were being replaced by light bombers. As a result, the order for the remaining 140 Shrikes was cancelled.

While the 10 aircraft received were taken on strength, with the RAAF serial prefix A69, only one of these Shrikes officially took to the air in RAAF service. A69-4 was assigned to No. 1 Air Performance Unit, for performance testing, between December 1943 and April 1944.  The RAAF and US Fifth Air Force already operated a joint pool of aircraft types common to both services in the South West Pacific theatre and, by mid-January 1944, the other nine Shrikes had been transferred to USAAF units.  A69-4 was also transferred to the USAAF in December 1944.

British service
The Helldiver's service with the British resembled Australian experience with the type. A total of 26 aircraft, out of 450 ordered, were delivered to the Royal Navy's Fleet Air Arm, where they were known as the Helldiver I. After unsatisfactory tests by the A&AEE that pinpointed "appalling handling", none of the British Helldivers were used in action.

Greek service

American aid provided the Royal Hellenic Air Force with 48 Curtiss SB2C-5 Helldivers from surplus U.S. Navy stocks. The aircraft were delivered by the aircraft carrier USS Sicily (CVE-118) in the spring of 1949. From the 48 aircraft, 6 were used for ground instruction or spare parts and 42 were given to 336th Fighter Squadron (336 Μοίρα Διώξεως) to replace Supermarine Spitfires and the squadron's name was changed to 336th Bomber Squadron (336 Μοίρα Βομβαρδισμού).

Greek SB2C-5 Helldivers had minor changes for their COIN operations: the hard rubber tailwheel (for carrier use) was replaced by a bigger pneumatic tire for use on landing strips; and the rear gunner station and its twin MGs were deleted, as no aerial opposition existed and weight reduction was used for bombs and extra machine guns.

Curtiss SB2C-5 Helldivers, Supermarine Spitfires, and North American T-6D/Gs were used in ground-attack missions against Communist ground forces, camps, and transports during the last stages of the Greek Civil War.

Curtiss SB2C-5 Helldivers saw a relatively brief combat service and were gradually phased out by 1953. A few were in use until 1957 as photographic aircraft. One Curtiss SB2C-5 Helldiver was restored in 1997 and is displayed in the Hellenic Air Force Museum.

French service

Between 1949 and 1954, France bought 110 SB2C-5 Helldiver aircraft to replace their aging SBD-5 Dauntless that had been flying in combat in Vietnam. The French Aeronavale flew the Helldiver from 1951 to 1958.

Some of these aircraft were allotted to flottilles 3F and 9F stationed on board the carriers Arromanches, Bois Belleau, and La Fayette, during the First Indochina War. The Helldivers were used to support French troops on the ground during the Battle of Dien Bien Phu in 1954.

Variants
XSB2C-1
Prototype powered by a 1,700 hp (1,268 kW) R-2600-8 engine
SB2C-1
Production version for United States Navy with four 0.50 in (12.7 mm) wing guns and one 0.30 in (7.62 mm) dorsal gun, 200 built.
SB2C-1A
Original designation for United States Army Air Corps version which became A-25A later used for 410 A-25As transferred to the United States Marine Corps.
SB2C-1C
SB2C-1 with two 20 mm (0.79 in) wing-mounted cannons and hydraulically operated flaps, 778 built. First to see combat.
XSB2C-2
One SB2C-1 fitted with twin floats in 1942.
SB2C-2
Production float plane version, 287 cancelled and not built.
XSB2C-3
One SB2C-1 re-engined with a 1,900 hp (1,417 kW) R-2600-20.
SB2C-3
As SB2C-1c re-engined with a 1,900 hp (1,417 kW) R-2600-20 and four-bladed propeller, 1,112 built.
SB2C-3E
SB2C-3s fitted with APS-4 radar.
SB2C-4
SB2C-1c but fitted with wing racks for eight 5 in (127 mm) rockets or 1,000 lb (454 kg) bombs, 2,045 built.
SB2C-4E
SB2C-4s fitted with APS-4 radar.
XSB2C-5
Two SB2C-4s converted as prototypes for -5 variant.
SB2C-5
SB2C-4 with increased fuel capacity, frameless sliding canopy, tailhook fixed in extended position, and deletion of the ASB radar, 970 built (2,500 cancelled).
XSB2C-6
Two SB2C-1Cs fitted with 2,100 hp (1,566 kW) R-2600-22 engine and increased fuel capacity.
SBF-1
Canadian built version of the SB2C-1, 50 built by Fairchild-Canada
SBF-3
Canadian built version of the SB2C-3, 150 built by Fairchild-Canada.
SBF-4E
Canadian built version of the SB2C-4E, 100 built by Fairchild-Canada.
SBW-1
Canadian built version of the SB2C-1, 38 built by Canadian Car & Foundry company.
SBW-1B
Canadian built version for lend-lease to the Royal Navy as the Helldiver I, 28 aircraft built by Canadian Car & Foundry company.
SBW-3
Canadian built version of the SB2C-3, 413 built by Canadian Car & Foundry company.
SBW-4E
Canadian built version of the SB2C-4E, 270 built by Canadian Car & Foundry company.

SBW-5
Canadian-built version of the SB2C-5, 85 built (165 cancelled) by the Canadian Car & Foundry company.
A-25A Shrike
United States Army Air Corps version without arrester gear or folding wings and equipment changed, 900 built
Helldiver I
Royal Navy designation for 28 Canadian-built SBW-1Bs

Operators

 Royal Australian Air Force

 French Navy Aviation Navale

 Royal Hellenic Air Force

 Italian Air Force operated 42 aircraft from 1950 until 1959

 Portuguese Navy (until 1952)
 Portuguese Air Force (after 1952)

 Royal Thai Air Force
 Royal Thai Navy

 Royal Navy Fleet Air Arm

 United States Army Air Forces
 United States Marine Corps
 United States Navy

Surviving aircraft

NOTE: All surviving aircraft identified by original US Navy Bureau of Aeronautics (BuAer) Bureau Numbers (BuNo).

Greece
On display
SB2C-5
83321 - Hellenic Air Force Museum, Decelea Air Base.

Thailand
On display
SB2C-5
83410 - Royal Thai Air Force Museum, Don Muang Royal Thai Air Force Base, Bangkok.

United States
Airworthy
SB2C-5
83589 -  based at the Commemorative Air Force (West Texas Wing) in Houston, Texas. This late-production Helldiver, built in 1945, makes frequent air show appearances. In 1982, it experienced engine failure and a hard emergency landing that caused extensive damage; volunteers of the CAF put in thousands of hours and spent in excess of $200,000 to restore the aircraft to flying condition once more. As of October 2018, it is still the only flying example in the world.
On display
SB2C-5
83479 - Steven F. Udvar-Hazy Center of the National Air and Space Museum in Chantilly, Virginia.
Under restoration
A-25A Shrike/SB2C-1A
75552 - under restoration at the National Museum of World War II Aviation in Colorado Springs, Colorado.
76805 - for display at the National Museum of the United States Air Force at Wright-Patterson AFB in Dayton, Ohio.
SB2C-3
19075 - for display at the Yanks Air Museum in Chino, California
SB2C-4
19866 - for display at the National Naval Aviation Museum at Naval Air Station Pensacola, Florida.  It crashed on 28 May 1945 in Lower Otay Reservoir, near San Diego, California after engine failure during a training exercise. Both pilot E.D. Frazer and his passenger escaped uninjured, but the Helldiver sank in 90 ft. of water. The aircraft was discovered in February 2010 by a fisherman and recovered on 20 August 2010 for restoration.
SB2C-5
83393 - for display at the Fagen Fighters WWII Museum in Granite Falls, Minnesota.
Wrecks
A SB2C-4E Helldiver belonging to the United States Navy crashed and burned in foul weather on October 9, 1945, while en route from New Cumberland, Pennsylvania to its base at Naval Air Station Grosse Ile, Michigan after participating in Nimitz Day celebrations held in Washington, D.C. Pilot Frank Campbell and gunner George Cohlmia, both World War II veterans, were killed in the crash. The remains of the plane are still located at the crash site on Laurel Hill in Ligonier Township, Pennsylvania, three miles southeast of the village of Waterford.
In January 2010, a scuba diver discovered a SB2C-1C Helldiver that was ditched in Maalaea Bay off South Maui in August 1944. The Helldiver is covered in coral and is missing its tail section. The aircraft experienced problems with its empennage after dive bombing maneuvers which forced pilot Lieutenant William Dill to ditch. It lies in 50 ft of water facing east. The site, which is protected under state and federal law, is in the process of being marked with a plaque by the U.S. Navy. A mooring may be installed at a later point in time to facilitate dives on the site.
On 25 March 2010, the Oregon State Police, Tillamook County Sheriff's Office, and the United States Navy announced that during a logging operation near Rockaway Beach, Oregon, the wreck of an SB2C Helldiver was located. Initial responders believe there may be human remains on the scene.
On 19 December 2011 Scuba divers off the coast of Jupiter, Florida came across an SB2C Helldiver while under water. The aircraft is mostly intact and was found inverted with the landing gear retracted. In May 2012, the US Navy conducted a survey of the aircraft, recovering a data plate from the horizontal stabilizer. The Naval History and Heritage Command's Underwater Archaeology Branch is actively trying to determine if the numbers stamped on the data plate are readable and will identify the aircraft.

Specifications (SB2C-4 Helldiver)

See also

References

Notes

Bibliography

 Abzug, Malcolm J. and E. Eugene Larrabee. Airplane Stability and Control: A History of the Technologies that Made Aviation Possible (Cambridge Aerospace Series). Cambridge, UK: Cambridge University Press, 1997. .
 Andrews, Harald. The Curtiss SB2C-1 Helldiver, Aircraft in Profile 124. Windsor, Berkshire, UK: Profile publications Ltd., 1967, reprinted 1971 and 1982. No ISBN.
 Bowers, Peter M. Curtiss Aircraft 1907-1947. London: Putnam & Company Ltd., 1979. .
 Brown, Eric, CBE, DCS, AFC, RN., William Green and Gordon Swanborough. "Curtiss Helldiver". Wings of the Navy, Flying Allied Carrier Aircraft of World War Two. London: Jane's Publishing Company, 1980, pp. 90–99. .
 Crosnier, Alain and Jean-Pierre Dubois. Douglas SBD-5 Dauntless & Curtiss SB2C-5 Helldiver: Bombardiers en piqué de l’Aéronautique Navale (in French). Clichy-la-Garenne, France: DTU sarl., 1998. .
 Donald, David, ed. American Warplanes of World War II. London: Aerospace Publishing, 1995. .
 Drendel, Lou. U.S. Navy Carrier Bombers of World War II. Carrollton, Texas: Squadron/Signal Publications, Inc., 1987. .
 Ethell, L. Jeffrey. Aircraft of World War II. Glasgow: HarperCollins Publishers, 1995. .
 Forsyth, John F. Helldivers, US Navy Dive-Bombers at War. St. Paul, Minnesota: Motorbooks International, 1991. .
 Kinzey, Bert. SB2C Helldiver in Detail & Scale, D&S Vol.52. Carrollton, Texas: Squadron/Signal Publications, 1997. .
 Ociepka, Paweł P. "Curtiss SB2C Helldiver" (in Polish). Skrzydła w miniaturze 12. Gdańsk, Poland: Avia-Press, 1995. ISSN 1234-4109.
 Shettle, M.L. Jr. United States Marine Corps Air Stations of World War II. Bowersville, Georgia: Schaertel Publishing Co., 2001. .
 Smith, Peter C. SB2C Helldiver. Ramsbury, Marlborough, Wiltshire, UK: The Crowood Press Ltd., 1998. .
 Stern, Robert. SB2C Helldiver in Action, Aircraft Number 54. Carrollton, Texas: Squadron/Signal Publications inc., 1982. .
 Swanborough, Gordon and Peter M. Bowers. United States Navy Aircraft since 1911. London: Putnam, Second edition, 1976. .
 Taylor, John W. R. "Curtiss SB2C/A-25 Helldiver." Combat Aircraft of the World from 1909 to the present. New York: G.P. Putnam's Sons, 1969. .
 Tillman, Barrett. Helldiver Units of World War 2. London: Osprey Publishing, 1997. .
 Tillman, Barrett and Robert L. Lawson. U.S. Navy Dive and Torpedo Bombers of WWII. St. Paul, Minnesota: Motor Books Publishing, 2001. .
 
 Winchester, Jim. "Curtiss SB2C Helldiver." Aircraft of World War II: The Aviation Factfile. Kent, UK: Grange Books plc, 2004. .

External links

"I Ride 'The Beast'." by J. Runyan, Popular Science, February 1945
The Commemorative Air Force's flying SB2C Helldiver
WW2DB: SB2C Helldiver
ENS Bob Barnes: Helldivers of the Big E
"The Greek Civil War, 1944-1949"
Flight 1943 article
Interior and exterior spherical panoramas of Commemorative AF flying museum

SB02C Helldiver
1940s United States bomber aircraft
Single-engined tractor aircraft
Low-wing aircraft
Carrier-based aircraft
World War II dive bombers of the United States
World War II ground attack aircraft of the United States
Aircraft first flown in 1940